Samuel Raphael Pera Junior (born March 11, 1989) is a weightlifter from the Cook Islands, competing in the +105 kg category. He was born in Rarotonga.

He is the son of weightlifter Sam Nunuku Pera, who represented the Cook Islands at the Summer Olympics in 1992, 1996, 2000, and 2004. At the 2006 Commonwealth Games he competed against his father in the 105 kg category, and won with 293 kg to 281 kg, ranking 9th.

Sam Pera Junior ranked 32nd at the 2007 World Championships, with a total of 330 kg.

He won the bronze medal at the 2008 Oceania Senior Championships, with a total of 335 kg.

At the 2008 Junior World Championships he ranked 13th, with a total of 340 kg.

He is representing the Cook Islands at the 2008 Summer Olympics, competing in the +105 kg division. He served as the Cook Islands flag-bearer in the 2008 Summer Olympics.

Major results

References

External links
 
 Biography on the website of the Beijing Olympics

1989 births
Living people
Olympic weightlifters of the Cook Islands
Weightlifters at the 2008 Summer Olympics
People from Rarotonga
Weightlifters at the 2006 Commonwealth Games
Commonwealth Games competitors for the Cook Islands
Cook Island male weightlifters